Cobaltite is a sulfide mineral composed of cobalt, arsenic, and sulfur, CoAsS. Its impurities may contain up to 10% iron and variable amounts of nickel. Structurally, it resembles pyrite (FeS2) with one of the sulfur atoms replaced by an arsenic atom.

Although rare, it is mined as a significant source of the strategically important metal cobalt. Secondary weathering incrustations of erythrite, hydrated cobalt arsenate, are common. A variety containing much iron replacing cobalt, and known as ferrocobaltite, was found at Siegen in Westphalia.

The name is from the German, Kobold, "underground spirit" in allusion to the "refusal" of cobaltiferous ores to smelt as they are expected to, including the foul-smelling, poisonous fumes the ores gave off. Cobaltite, which contains both arsenic and sulfur, was one of these ores.

It occurs in high-temperature hydrothermal deposits and contact metamorphic rocks. It occurs in association with magnetite, sphalerite, chalcopyrite, skutterudite, allanite, zoisite, scapolite, titanite, and calcite along with numerous other Co–Ni sulfides and arsenides. It was described as early as 1832.

It is found chiefly in Sweden, Norway, Germany, Cornwall, England, Canada, La Cobaltera, Chile, Australia, the Democratic Republic of the Congo, and Morocco.  Crystals have also been found at Khetri in Rajasthan, and under the name sehta the mineral was used by Indian jewellers for producing a blue enamel on gold and silver ornaments.

Cobaltite can be separated from other minerals by selective, pH controlled, flotation methods, where cobalt recovery usually involves hydrometallurgy. It can also be processed with pyrometallurgical methods, such as flash smelting.

References

Mineral galleries

Cobalt minerals
Iron minerals
Arsenic minerals
Sulfosalt minerals
Orthorhombic minerals
Minerals in space group 29